The Child Catcher is a fictional character in the 1968 film Chitty Chitty Bang Bang and in the later stage musical adaptation. The Child Catcher is employed by Baron Bomburst and Baroness Bomburst to snatch and imprison children on the streets of Vulgaria.

Character
In the film, the Child Catcher was played by ballet dancer Sir Robert Helpmann.  Whilst filming one of the scenes where the Child Catcher drives his horse and carriage out of the village, the carriage tipped over as it turned a corner with Helpmann on board. Dick Van Dyke recalls Helpmann, with great presence of mind, swinging out of the carriage and skipping across the crashing vehicle to safety. Van Dyke later commented that he had never seen anything as graceful in his life.  Helpmann was 60 years old at the time.  Helpmann's child co-stars recalled that behind the scenes, the actor loved children and was extremely kind to them, often making them laugh between takes, which made it difficult for them to pretend to be afraid of him. Also, Helpmann often shielded the children from the temper of director Ken Hughes, even telling him at one point to stop swearing in front of them. 

The Child Catcher does not appear in Fleming's original book. Reputedly, Roald Dahl (co-author of the film's screenplay) created the character. Dahl's screenplay was heavily rewritten by Ken Hughes, the director, who said he had created the character. However, the character's black hat, long black coat, pointed nose and role as, effectively, a Nazi substitute have been seen as antisemitic.

In the theatrical version in London's West End, he has been played by Richard O'Brien, Wayne Sleep (another ballet dancer), and Stephen Gately amongst others and on Broadway, he was played by Kevin Cahoon. In the Australian theatrical version, he was played by Tyler Coppin who wrote and performs a solo show about Robert Helpmann called LyreBird (Tales of Helpmann).

In 2005, the Child Catcher was voted "the scariest villain in children's books".

In 2008, Entertainment Weekly called Helpmann's depiction of the Child Catcher one of the "50 Most Vile Movie Villains."

References

Chitty Chitty Bang Bang characters
Fictional kidnappers
Film characters introduced in 1968
Fictional henchmen
Male film villains